This is a list of boycotts.

Past

Sporting 
Certain countries have declined to participate in international sporting events to protest the host nation's policies or actions.

Ongoing

See also

Moral purchasing

References

External links
List of current boycotts at EthicalConsumer.org

History-related lists